The 1954 United States Senate elections was a midterm election in the first term of Dwight D. Eisenhower's presidency. The 32 Senate seats of Class 2 were contested in regular elections, and six special elections were held to fill vacancies. Eisenhower's Republican party lost a net of two seats to the Democratic opposition. This small change was just enough to give Democrats control of the chamber with the support of an Independent (Wayne Morse of Oregon) who caucused with them.

The elections resulted in a divided government that continued to the end of Eisenhower's presidency and a Democratic majority that would last until 1981. , this is the last Senate election cycle in which a state (both Nebraska and North Carolina) had to hold three simultaneous elections (two special elections and one regular election) due to the near-simultaneous deaths of both incumbent Senators.

Results summary 

Colored shading indicates party with largest share of that row.

Source: Clerk of the U.S. House of Representatives

Gains, losses and holds

Retirements
One Republican and one Democrat retired instead of seeking re-election. Two Republicans and one Democrat also retired instead of finishing the unexpired term.

Defeats
Three Republicans and two Democrats sought re-election, and two Republicans and one Democrat also sought election to finish the unexpired term, but lost in the primary or general election.

Change in composition

Before the elections

Results of the elections

Race summaries

Special elections during the 83rd Congress 

In these special elections, the winners were seated during 1954 or before January 3, 1955; ordered by election date, then state, then class.

Races leading to the 84th Congress 

In these general elections, the winner was seated on January 3, 1955; ordered by state.

All of the elections involved the Class 2 seats.

Closest races 
Twelve races had a margin of victory under 10%:

Alabama

Arkansas

California (special) 

Following the resignation of Richard Nixon to assume the vice presidency, Governor Earl Warren appointed Thomas Kuchel to Nixon's seat; Kuchel assumed the office on January 2, 1953.

Colorado

Delaware

Georgia

Idaho

Illinois

Iowa

Kansas

Kentucky

Louisiana

Maine

Massachusetts 

In Massachusetts, Republican Incumbent Leverett Saltonstall defeated his challengers.

Democrat Foster Furcolo (Treasurer and Receiver-General of Massachusetts since 1952 and member of the United States House of Representatives from Massachusetts's 2nd congressional district from 1949 to 1952) beat John I. Fitzgerald (former member of the Boston City Council and Democratic candidate for Senate in 1948) and Joseph L. Murphy (former member of the Massachusetts Senate).

Republican incumbent Leverett Saltonstall (United States senator since 1945 and Governor of Massachusetts from 1939 to 1945) was renominated. Other nominees included Socialist Workers Thelma Ingersoll (ran for Senate in 1952.) and Prohibition Harold J. Ireland (candidate for Treasurer and Receiver-General in 1948 and 1952).

Michigan

Minnesota

Mississippi

Montana 

In Montana incumbent senator James E. Murray, who was first elected to the Senate in a special election in 1934 and was re-elected in 1936, 1942, and 1948, ran for re-election.

Murray won the Democratic primary against trivial opponents (farmer Ray E. Gulick and Sam G. Feezell).

Republican Wesley A. D'Ewart United States Congressman from Montana's 2nd congressional district beat Robert Yellowtail, former Superintendent of the Crow Indian Reservation, for the GOP nomination.

A contentious and close election ensued, but ultimately, Murray was able to narrowly win re-election over D'Ewart to a final term in the Senate.

Nebraska 

Nebraska had three Senate elections on the ballot. Both incumbents had died in the span of three months, leading to appointments and special elections.

Nebraska (special, class 1) 

Incumbent Republican Hugh A. Butler died July 1, 1954, and Republican Samuel W. Reynolds was appointed July 3 to continue the term. Reynolds did not run to finish the term, and Republican Roman Hruska won the seat in November to finish the term ending in 1959.

Nebraska (special, class 2) 

Incumbent Republican Dwight P. Griswold died April 12, 1954, and Republican Eva Bowring was appointed April 16 to continue the term. In November, Republican Hazel Abel was elected to finish the term.

Nebraska (regular) 

Although elected to finish the class 2 term, Abel did not run for the next term, and Republican Carl Curtis was elected in November to the next term.

On December 31, 1954, Abel resigned and Curtis was appointed January 1, 1955, two days ahead of his elected term.

Nevada (special)

New Hampshire

New Hampshire (regular)

New Hampshire (special)

New Jersey

New Mexico

North Carolina 

Like Nebraska, North Carolina, had three elections on the ballot. Both senators had died during the 83rd Congress, leading to appointments and special elections.

North Carolina (special, class 2) 

Democrat Willis Smith died June 26, 1953, and Democrat Alton A. Lennon was appointed July 10 to continue the term. In November, Lennon lost the nomination to Democrat W. Kerr Scott to finish the term. Scott took office November 29, 1954.

North Carolina (regular) 

Democrat W. Kerr Scott was also elected to the next term, which would begin January 3, 1955.

North Carolina (special, class 3) 

Democrat Clyde R. Hoey died May 12, 1954, and Democrat Sam Ervin was appointed June 5 to continue the term. In November, Ervin was elected to finish the term.

Ohio (special)

Oklahoma

Oregon

Rhode Island

South Carolina 

In South Carolina, Senator Burnet R. Maybank did not face a primary challenge in the summer and was therefore renominated as the Democratic Party's nominee for the election in the fall. However, his death on September 1 left the Democratic Party without a nominee and the executive committee decided to nominate state Senator Edgar A. Brown as their candidate for the election. Many South Carolinians were outraged by the party's decision to forgo a primary election and former Governor Strom Thurmond entered the race as a write-in candidate. He easily won the election and became the first U.S. senator to be elected by a write-in vote (William Knowland of California in 1946 was technically the first, but the ballots in that election were blank with no candidates listed, so essentially every candidate was running a write-in campaign).

Sitting Senator Burnet R. Maybank entered the 1954 contest without a challenge in the Democratic primary nor in the general election. His unexpected death on September 1 caused panic and confusion within the hierarchy of the state Democratic party because the state law required that a party's nominee be certified by September 3. Hours after Maybank's funeral, the state Democratic executive committee met in secret and chose state Senator Edgar A. Brown of Barnwell County as the party's nominee for the general election. Not only was Brown a part of the "Barnwell Ring", but he was also a member of the executive committee.

The state Democratic Party's decision to choose a candidate without holding a special primary election drew widespread criticism across the state. On September 3, The Greenville News ran an editorial advocating that a primary election be called and several newspapers across the state followed suit. At least six county Democratic committees repudiated the action by the state committee and called for a primary election. Despite repeated calls for a primary, the state executive committee voted against holding a primary because they did not think that there was enough time before the general election to hold a primary election.

Immediately after the executive committee voted against holding a primary election, former Governor Strom Thurmond and lumberman Marcus Stone announced their intention to run as Democratic write-in candidates. Thurmond and his supporters stated that the executive committee had several legal alternatives as opposed to the outright appointment of state Senator Brown. In addition, Thurmond promised that if he were elected he would resign in 1956 so that the voters could choose a candidate in the regular primary for the remaining four years of the term.

Thurmond received support from Governor James F. Byrnes and from those who backed his Presidential bid as a Dixiecrat in the 1948 Presidential election. Thurmond framed the race as a "moral issue: democracy versus committee rule" and his write-in campaign was repeatedly assisted by every newspaper in the state, except for those in Anderson. For instance, The News and Courier devoted its front page on November 2 to show voters a sample ballot and it also provided detailed instructions on how to cast a write-in vote. Not only that, but the newspaper also printed an editorial on the front page giving precise reasons why voters should vote for Thurmond instead of Brown.

On the other hand, Brown was supported by the Democratic party regulars and he also gained the endorsement of Senator Olin D. Johnston. Brown based his campaign entirely on the issue of party loyalty, stressing that Thurmond was a Republican ally because he had voted for President Eisenhower in 1952.

Marcus A. Stone, a lumberman in Florence and Dillon, was a candidate in previous Democratic primaries for governor and senator. He did very little campaigning for the general election.

South Dakota

Tennessee

Texas

Virginia 

In Virginia, Democratic incumbent Senator Absalom Willis Robertson defeated Independent Democrat Charles Lewis and Social Democrat Clarke Robb and was re-elected to a third term in office.

West Virginia

Wyoming 

There were two elections the same day to the same seat, due to the June 19, 1954, death of Democrat Lester C. Hunt.  Both elections were won by Democratic former senator Joseph C. O'Mahoney.

Wyoming (special) 

Republican Edward D. Crippa was appointed June 24, 1954, to continue the term, pending a November 2 special election.

Wyoming (regular) 

O'Mahoney would serve out the remainder of Hunt's term followed by this one term and then retire after 1960.

See also 

 1954 United States elections
 1954 United States House of Representatives elections
 83rd United States Congress
 84th United States Congress

Notes

References

Sources 

 
 
 
 "Supplemental Report of the Secretary of State to the General Assembly of South Carolina." Reports and Resolutions of South Carolina to the General Assembly of the State of South Carolina. Volume I. Columbia, SC: 1955, pp. 4–5.
 U.S. Senate Biography of Strom Thurmond